Fawsitt is a surname. Notable people with the surname include:

 Amy Fawsitt (1836–1876), English actress
 Dylan Fawsitt (born 1990), Irish-American rugby union player

See also
 Fawcett (surname)